Inverness railway station is the railway station serving the Scottish city of Inverness. It is the terminus of the Highland Main Line, the Aberdeen–Inverness line (of which the Inverness and Nairn Railway is now a part), the Kyle of Lochalsh line and the Far North Line.

The Aberdeen and Perth lines diverge at Millburn Junction a short distance beyond Welsh's Bridge.

History

Inverness station was opened on 5 November 1855 as the western terminus of the Inverness and Nairn Railway to designs by the architect, Joseph Mitchell. The station originally comprised a single covered passenger platform  with three lines of rails, one for arrivals, one for departures and a spare line for carriages.

In 1857 the railway company erected a clock in front of the station facing Academy Street. This clock by Bryson & Sons, Princes Street, Edinburgh, was illuminated at night.

In 1865 the station was enlarged. There were double lines for north and south traffic.

The station platforms were lit by electricity for the first time in 1908.

In 1933, as part of an internal reorganization, the London and North Eastern Railway closed their offices at the station and the staff relocated to Aberdeen.

Between 1966 and 1968 under British Rail the station buildings were replaced, the new design by Thomas Munro and Company.

A revamp by Mott Macdonald of the station's frontage, forecourt and concourse was planned to be completed by 2018. However this was delayed. The nearby Royal Highland Hotel refused to give up their lease of parking spaces in front of the station.

Location 
The station is located between three roads in the city centre - Falcon Square, Academy Street and Strothers Lane. It is a 2-minute walk from the Eastgate Shopping Centre, and approximately 8 minutes from Inverness Castle and the Museum & Art Gallery. A taxi rank is located on the corner of Academy Street and Falcon Square.

Rose Street Curve 
This line is a rarely-used piece of track which avoids the station, linking the Far North and Kyle of Lochalsh lines to the Highland Main Line and the line to Aberdeen. In recent years it has fallen in to disuse, but up to 2019 it was used weekly on Saturdays by a train from Kyle of Lochalsh to Elgin. Such trains would not easily be visible from the station.

Facilities 
Platform destination LED screens are installed, along with a main departures and arrivals information board. Each of Platforms 1-7 has its own screen showing departures from that platform. Screens are also present behind the wall for all platforms from 3–6. In addition, several other screens are also visible for general information. The main concourse is equipped with a ticket office and ticket machines, a barber shop, a bar, a cafe, toilets, a waiting room, a lost property office, a vending machine, a cash machine, payphones and help points. The station has 3 car parks and all of the station has step-free access.

Platform layout

Inverness is owned by Network Rail. However, it is operated by ScotRail who run most of the services using the station. Caledonian Sleeper and London North Eastern Railway run the only non-ScotRail services.

The station itself sits at one apex of a triangular junction in the centre of Inverness, with each half of the station connected to one line. The Highland Main and Aberdeen Lines both approach the station from the east and use Platforms 1–4, while the Far North Line (which also carries traffic heading for the Kyle Line) approach from the north-west and use Platforms 5–7. Platform 5 also has a connection from the east side, but it is only usable by a two car train, and even then, it must not be in passenger service and movements from Platform 5 to the east line are not allowed. Platform 1 is long enough for a 13-coach train; platform 2 can hold 15 coaches; platforms 3 and 4, eight each; and platforms 5–7 will accommodate five coaches each.

Passenger volume 

The statistics cover twelve month periods that start in April.

Services

Rail
As of May 2022, Inverness has the following Monday–Saturday services:
6 trains per day to Edinburgh Waverley (6 via Aviemore and 1 via Aberdeen)
7 trains per day to Glasgow Queen Street via Perth
11 trains per day to Aberdeen (one of which extends to Stonehaven)
6 trains per day to Elgin only
4 trains per day to Wick via Thurso
4 trains per day to Kyle of Lochalsh
1 train per day to each of Dingwall, Invergordon, Tain and Ardgay
1 train per day to London King's Cross via Falkirk Grahamston, Edinburgh Waverley, Newcastle and York ("Highland Chieftain"), operated by LNER
1 sleeper train per day to London Euston via Preston and Crewe (Highland Caledonian Sleeper - doesn't operate on Saturday nights)

On Sundays a reduced service operates on all routes, this being:
5 trains per day to Edinburgh Waverley via Perth
2 trains per day to Glasgow Queen Street
5 trains per day to Aberdeen
2 trains per day to Elgin
1 train per day to Wick
1 train per day to Kyle of Lochalsh
3 trains per day to Tain
1 train per day to Invergordon
1 train per day to London Kings Cross
1 sleeper train per day to London Euston via Preston and Crewe (Highland Caledonian Sleeper)

Future proposals 
In early 2020, a massive reconstruction project was announced, which included the neighbouring Sports Direct and TK Maxx stores being purchased as well as the former Royal Mail sorting office and car park. It is part of a plan to majorly reduce  emissions in the City Centre, with this, the ability to have electric trains running to the station suggested electrification of lines north of the central belt. It was also announced that it would have fuelling for hydrogen vehicles as well as e-bike stations.

In the future, this station will be one of those to benefit from a package of timetable enhancements to be introduced by Transport Scotland and Scotrail.  The current Perth to Inverness timetable will be increased to hourly each way, with trains south of there running on alternate hours to Edinburgh & Glasgow.  Journey times will be reduced by 10 minutes to both cities. The service to Nairn, Forres & Elgin will also be enhanced to hourly and some Aberdeen trains extended through to Dundee and beyond. As of May 2022, this has still not yet taken place.

Connections 
The main coach and bus station is located in Margaret Street, 150 m northwest of and just around the corner from the railway station. Many services can also be joined at the stop on Millburn Road outside Marks and Spencer, closer to the station.

Aside from local buses, there are also long-distance coach services which allow rail passengers to continue their journey to areas of the Highlands not on the rail network:
Scottish Citylink route 961 operates two daily return services to Ullapool to connect with Caledonian MacBrayne ferry sailings to Stornoway on the Isle of Lewis.
Scottish Citylink route 919 operates six daily return services down the Great Glen to Fort William, calling at Urquhart Castle, Fort Augustus and intermediate points. Two of these services allow onward connections with Citylink route 918 from Fort William to Oban.

Stagecoach North Scotland route 11 runs every 30 minutes between Inverness city centre and Inverness Airport. The bus leaves from Strothers Lane, just around the corner from the station. Journey time to the airport is 25 minutes.

References

Bibliography

External links

 Inverness Station Information

Railway stations in Highland (council area)
Former Highland Railway stations
Railway stations in Great Britain opened in 1855
Railway stations served by ScotRail
Railway stations served by Caledonian Sleeper
Railway stations served by London North Eastern Railway
Transport in Inverness
Joseph Mitchell railway stations